Andréia Rosa de Andrade (born July 8, 1984), known as Andréia Rosa, is a Brazilian football defender who plays for the Brazilian women's national team and the Norwegian Toppserien club Avaldsnes.

Club career
At the time of her call-up for the 2008 Olympics, Andréia Rosa had played in 181 games for Ferroviária. In those matches she had scored 42 goals from her centre-back position and been sent off only once. In 2007, she was loaned to Saad for the inaugural Copa do Brasil de Futebol Feminino, which Ferroviária did not enter.

In summer 2013 Andréia Rosa joined ambitious Norwegian club Avaldsnes, where she joined compatriots Rosana and Debinha.

International career
In November 2006 Andréia Rosa made her international debut in Brazil's 6–1 South American Women's Football Championship win over Bolivia at Estadio José María Minella, Mar del Plata. In July 2008 she was involved in a "violent collision" with Abby Wambach during the first half of a friendly match in San Diego. Wambach suffered a broken tibia and fibula, requiring a titanium rod to be inserted into her left leg.

Andréia Rosa was included in Brazil's 18-player squad for the 2008 Beijing Olympics and started the team's first match; a 0–0 draw with Germany at Shenyang Olympic Sports Center Stadium. Although she took no further part in the competition, she won a silver medal when Brazil lost the final 1–0 after extra time to the United States.

She narrowly missed selection for the Brazilian FIFA Women's World Cup squad in both 2007 and 2011.

In October 2017 Andréia Rosa was one of five Brazil players to quit international football, disgruntled at pay and conditions, and the Brazilian Football Confederation's sacking of head coach Emily Lima.

Personal life
She was born in São Pedro do Turvo, São Paulo, Brazil. Andréia Rosa is a qualified physical education teacher and an Evangelical Christian.

Notes

References

External links
 
Athlete bio at 2008 Olympics site
Andréia Rosa de Andrade profile at the Brazilian Football Confederation's official website

1984 births
Living people
People from Matão
Brazilian women's footballers
Brazilian expatriate footballers
Women's association football defenders
Olympic footballers of Brazil
Olympic silver medalists for Brazil
Footballers at the 2008 Summer Olympics
Olympic medalists in football
Medalists at the 2008 Summer Olympics
Brazil women's international footballers
Andreia
Toppserien players
Avaldsnes IL players
Brazilian evangelicals
Associação Desportiva Centro Olímpico players
Associação Ferroviária de Esportes (women) players
Brazilian expatriate sportspeople in Norway
Saad Esporte Clube (women) players
Footballers from São Paulo (state)